is Pink Lady's 21st single, released on January 21, 1981. The single failed to be a hit, peaking at 85 in the Oricon charts. It was never promoted on television, nor was it ever performed live by the duo.

The song sold 100,000 copies.

In 2018, the song was performed live for the first time by Mie during her  show at Blues Alley Japan.

Track listing

Chart positions

References

External links
 

1981 singles
1981 songs
Pink Lady (band) songs
Japanese-language songs
New wave songs
Victor Entertainment singles